Unplugged (The Official Bootleg) is a live unplugged performance by Paul McCartney, recorded and released in 1991.  Following the vastness of his world tour recently captured on Tripping the Live Fantastic, McCartney relished the opportunity to strip back his songs and appear on the  acoustic-only show MTV Unplugged, which had only been on air for over a year at that point. Consequently, McCartney was the first in a long line of artists to release an album of their performance on the show.

Unlike other artists who appeared on the acclaimed show with acoustic instruments plugged into amplifiers (producing the sound heard), McCartney's instruments were 100 percent unplugged. Microphones were carefully placed close to guitars, pianos, etc. to pick up the sound (this can be seen on the album cover, where a large rectangular microphone is pictured in front of McCartney's acoustic guitar).

Using the same line-up that had recently backed him (save for Blair Cunningham who had replaced Chris Whitten), McCartney used the opportunity to dust off some of his rarer tracks, including three from his 1970 debut album McCartney, alongside several covers and amid a helping of familiar Beatles hits.

Songs
Several tracks performed in the show were not included on the album, as follows: "Things We Said Today", "Midnight Special", "Matchbox", "Mean Woman Blues" and "The Fool". Numbers rehearsed by the band but not performed at all include: "Mother Nature's Son", "Figure of Eight", "Cut Across Shorty", "Heartbreak Hotel", "Heart of the Country", "She's My Baby", and "Mrs. Vandebilt". "Things We Said Today", "Mean Woman Blues" and "Midnight Special" would see official release two years later in 1993 as B-sides to the "Biker Like an Icon" single.

Release
With McCartney in a loose and carefree context, critical response to Unplugged (The Official Bootleg) was very warm.

Initially released in a limited edition, individually numbered run in 1991, Unplugged (The Official Bootleg)—with artwork that recalls Снова в СССР's—was reissued in a more permanent fashion in the late 1990s. Upon its original issue, it reached number 7 in the UK and became McCartney's highest-peaking US album in almost ten years, reaching number 14.

Track listing

Personnel 
Paul McCartney – acoustic guitar, vocals, drums on "Ain't No Sunshine"
Linda McCartney – Indian harmonium, percussion, harmony vocals on "And I Love Her"
Hamish Stuart – acoustic bass guitar, acoustic guitar and lead vocals on "And I Love Her" and "Ain't No Sunshine"
Robbie McIntosh – acoustic guitars, dobro, vocals, piano on "Ain't No Sunshine"
Paul "Wix" Wickens – piano, keyboards, accordion, percussion, vocals, acoustic bass on "Ain't No Sunshine"
Blair Cunningham – drums, percussions, vocals

Charts

References 

MTV Unplugged albums
Paul McCartney live albums
1991 live albums
Parlophone live albums